Matthews House or Matthews Hall may refer to:

United States
(by state then city)
 Justin Matthews Jr. House, North Little Rock, Arkansas, listed on the National Register of Historic Places (NRHP) in Pulaski County
 Matthews House (North Little Rock, Arkansas), listed on the NRHP in Pulaski County
 Matthews-Bradshaw House, North Little Rock, Arkansas, listed on the NRHP in Pulaski County
 Matthews-Bryan House, North Little Rock, Arkansas, listed on the NRHP in Pulaski County
 Matthews-Dillon House, North Little Rock, Arkansas, listed on the NRHP in Pulaski County
 Matthews-Godt House, North Little Rock, Arkansas, listed on the NRHP in Pulaski County
 Matthews-MacFadyen House, North Little Rock, Arkansas, listed on the NRHP in Pulaski County
 Butler-Matthews Homestead, Tulip, Arkansas, listed on the NRHP in Dallas County
 Matthews Hall (Arizona State University), listed on the NRHP in Maricopa County
 Matthews House (Danburg, Georgia), listed on the NRHP in Lincoln County
 Harman-Watson-Matthews House, Greenville, Georgia, listed on the NRHP in Meriwether County
 Thomas and Margaret Spencer Matthews Farm, Amador, Michigan, listed on the NRHP in Sanilac County
 Matthews Place, Hollister, North Carolina, listed on the NRHP in Halifax County
 Dr. James O. Matthews Office, Taylors Bridge, North Carolina, listed on the NRHP in Sampson County
 Halloran-Matthews-Brady House, Spearfish, South Dakota, listed on the NRHP in Lawrence County
 Pleasant L. Matthews House, Georgetown, Tennessee, listed on the NRHP in Hamilton County
 Matthews-Atwood House, Ennis, Texas, listed on the NRHP in Ellis County
 Matthews-Templeton House, Ennis, Texas, listed on the NRHP in Ellis County

See also
 Mathews House (disambiguation)